Tom's of Maine is a brand name and manufacturing company of natural personal care products. Tom's of Maine has been a majority-owned subsidiary of Colgate-Palmolive since 2006. The company's products are sourced and derived from nature, with formulas that are free of artificial flavors, fragrances, colors, sweeteners, and preservatives. The products are not tested on animals, and the company claims that its ingredient processing  is supportive of human and environmental health. While most of the company's products are vegan, some products contain propolis and/or beeswax sourced from bees. The company was founded in 1970 by Tom Chappell and Kate Chappell (née Cheney) in Maine, United States.

History
Tom's of Maine was founded by Tom and Kate Chappell in 1970 with US$5,000. The company is based in Kennebunk, Maine, US and is a division of multinational conglomerate Colgate-Palmolive. Tom's of Maine has approximately 120 employees. The company also employs factories elsewhere in the US and Canada via contract to produce some of their products.

Its approximately 90 oral- and body-care products are sold at more than 40,000 retail outlets worldwide. Their product lines include soaps, toothpastes, deodorants, and mouthwashes, among others. Their fluoride toothpastes are the only natural alternatives to common, industrial-ingredient dentifrices to earn the American Dental Association's Seal of Acceptance.

Acquisition
In 2006, a controlling 84% stake in Tom's of Maine was purchased by Colgate-Palmolive for US$100,000,000; the Chappells own the remaining sixteen percent. The terms of the purchase stipulate that the policies and company culture of the Tom's of Maine brand will be retained.

References

External links

Official Colgate-Palmolive website

Brands of toothpaste
Companies based in Maine
Companies based in York County, Maine
Kennebunk, Maine
Manufacturing companies based in Maine
American companies established in 1970
1970 establishments in Maine
Oral hygiene
American brands
Colgate-Palmolive brands
B Lab-certified corporations